Serge Blanco (born 31 August 1958) is a former rugby union footballer who played fullback for Biarritz Olympique and the French national side, gaining 93 caps, 81 of them at fullback. His alternative position was wing. He was generally nicknamed by French rugby fans as the Pelé of Rugby.

Blanco was born in Caracas, Venezuela, to a Venezuelan father and a Basque mother, but was raised in Biarritz, France. He made his international debut against South Africa at Loftus Versfeld Stadium on 8 November 1980, which France lost 37–15.

Playing career

He scored the deciding try in the semi-final of the inaugural Rugby World Cup in 1987, France winning 30–24 against hosts Australia. He also won Grand Slams with France in the 1981 and 1987 Five Nations Championship.

Serge Blanco captained the French side in the 1991 Rugby World Cup before retiring after their quarter-final defeat by England on 19 October 1991. He won a total of 93 caps (a record at the time) and still holds the record for the most tries scored for France (38). Despite his international success he has failed to win the national championship with his club Biarritz Olympique, despite making a final appearance in 1992. This match against Toulon was his last first-class rugby union match. In 1997 Serge Blanco was among the inaugural set of rugby players inducted into the International Rugby Hall of Fame. In 2011, he was also inducted into the IRB Hall of Fame.

Administration
After retiring as a player, he continued serving Biarritz Olympique as their president. In this role he saw his club become French champions in 2002 and 2006. He was president of France's national professional league, Ligue Nationale de Rugby, until December 2008. Outside of rugby he is a businessman, owning three hotels and a brand of sportswear and eyeglasses 

In March 2009 he suffered a heart attack but recovered after surgery.

See also
International Rugby Hall of Fame
IRB Hall of Fame
List of rugby union test caps leaders

References and notes

External links
 ESPN Profile

 Thalasso Serge Blanco

1958 births
Living people
Sportspeople from Caracas
French-Basque people
French people of Venezuelan descent
French rugby union players
Sportspeople from Biarritz
Rugby union fullbacks
Rugby union wings
World Rugby Hall of Fame inductees
Biarritz Olympique players
France international rugby union players
Venezuelan emigrants to France